Neculai Nichitean (born 27 September 1969) in Șcheia, is a former Romanian rugby union football player and currently a coach. He played as a fly-half.

Club career
Nichitean played for Suceava, Baia Mare, Universitatea Cluj and also for Mirano, Bologna and Modena in Italy. After retiring from playing he coached Romanian rugby club Universitatea Cluj.

International career
Nichitean gathered 28 caps for Romania, from his debut in 1990 to his last game in 1997. He scored 45 penalties and 18 conversions during his international career, 201 points on aggregate. He was a member of his national side for the 2nd and 3rd Rugby World Cups in 1991 and 1995 and played in 4 group matches.

References

External links

1969 births
Living people
Romanian rugby union players
Romanian rugby union coaches
Romania international rugby union players
CSM Știința Baia Mare players
CS Universitatea Cluj-Napoca (rugby union) players
Rugby union fly-halves
People from Suceava County